Redford is a locality split between the Maranoa Region and the Shire of Murweh, both in Queensland, Australia.

Road infrastructure
The Warrego Highway passes to the south and the Landsborough Highway to the west.

Education 
There are no schools in Redford. The nearest primary schools are in Mungallala, Morven and Augathella. The nearest secondary schools in Injune (to Year 10 only), Mitchell (to Year 10 only), and Charleville (to Year 12).

References 

Shire of Murweh
Localities in Queensland